Azizi Bank is one of the largest commercial banks in Afghanistan. It has 80 branches including extension counters and around 100 ATMs across Afghanistan. The bank opened on June 13, 2006, and is headquartered in Zanbaq Square, Kabul, Afghanistan.

, Azizi Bank employed around 1,600 staff, 13% of whom were female. During the 2021 Taliban offensive, its fighters escorted female employees from a branch of the bank in Kandahar and ordered them not to return.

References

Further reading
"Capitalism Comes to Afghanistan". Time. (December 4, 2006).
"Life's a lottery in the new Afghanistan". Sydney Morning Herald. (September 18, 2006).

External links 

Banks of Afghanistan
Banks established in 2006